Lakes Grammar is an independent Anglican co-educational primary and secondary day school, located at the northern end of the Central Coast in the suburb of Warnervale, New South Wales, Australia.  The school has two distinct spaces; a Junior School for students from Year K to Year 6; and Senior School for students from Year 7 to Year 12.

Lakes Grammar is accredited according to the standards of Kids Matter, an Australian mental health and well-being framework.

History 

The school was established in 2004 with Michael Hannah as the Principal.

In 2021, principal Michael Hannah retired, this would be the first time that the principal of Lakes Grammar would be changed. As of 2021, the principal is Deborah Clancy.

See also 

 List of Anglican schools in New South Wales
 Anglican education in Australia

References

External links 
 

Anglican primary schools in New South Wales
Anglican secondary schools in New South Wales
Educational institutions established in 2004
Junior School Heads Association of Australia Member Schools
Independent Schools Association (Australia)
Grammar schools in Australia
2004 establishments in Australia
Central Coast (New South Wales)